Potato Creek may refer to:

Potato Creek (Flint River tributary), a creek in Georgia
Potato Creek (Schenevus Creek tributary), a creek in New York
Potato Creek (Pennsylvania), a stream in Pennsylvania
Potato Creek (White River), a stream in South Dakota
Potato Creek, South Dakota, an unincorporated community
Potato Creek State Park, a state park in Indiana

See also
Potato River (disambiguation)